Louis-Prudent-Alexandre Robichaud (25 January 1890 – 17 March 1971) was a New Brunswick political figure and jurist.

Robichaud was born in Cocagne, New Brunswick. He was educated at the University of St. Joseph's College where he earned his Bachelor of Arts and at Dalhousie University where he graduated with a law degree. He began his law practice in Richibouctou-Village, New Brunswick in 1915.

He first ran for federal office in the 1925 federal election but was defeated in Kent. He tried again in the same riding in the 1935 federal election and was returned to the House of Commons of Canada as a Liberal MP. He did not run for re-election in the 1940 election. He sat on the province's war committee during the 1940s and, in 1950, was appointed a Probate court judge. Robichaud died in 1971 in Richibucto.

Electoral history

References

External links
 

1890 births
Acadian people
Lawyers in New Brunswick
Judges in New Brunswick
Members of the House of Commons of Canada from New Brunswick
Liberal Party of Canada MPs
1971 deaths